Gonçalo da Silveira, S.J. (23 February 1526 – 6 March 1561) was a Portuguese Jesuit missionary in southern Africa.

Life
He was the tenth child of Dom Luís da Silveira, first count of Sortelha, and Dona Beatriz Coutinho, daughter of Dom Fernando Coutinho, Marshal of the Kingdom of Portugal. Losing his parents in infancy, he was brought up by his sister Filipa de Vilhena and her husband, the Marquis of Távora.

Silveira was educated by the Friars Minor of the friary of Santa Margarida until 1542, when he went to finish his studies at the University of Coimbra, but he had been there little more than a year when he was received into the Society of Jesus by Father Miron, the Rector of the Jesuit college at Coimbra.

Silveira was appointed provincial superior of India in 1555. The appointment was approved by St. Ignatius Loyola a few months before his death. Gonçalo's term of government in India lasted three years. He used to say that God had given him the great grace of unsuitability for government — apparently basing this on a certain want of tact in dealing with human weakness.

The next provincial, António Quadros, sent Silveira to the unexplored mission field of south-east Africa. Landing at Sofala on 11 March 1560, da Silveira proceeded to Otongwe near Cape Correntes. There, during his stay of seven weeks, he instructed and baptized the Makaranga chief, Gamba, and about 450 natives of his kraal. Towards the end of the year he started up the Zambezi River on his expedition to the capital of the Monomotapa, which appears to have been the N'Pande kraal in Zimbabwe, close by the M'Zingesi River, a southern tributary of the Zambezi. He arrived there on 26 December 1560, and remained until his death. During this period he baptized the king and a large number of his subjects. Some Arabs from Mozambique agitated against the missionary, and Silveira was strangled in his hut by order of the king.

The expedition sent to avenge Silveira's death never reached its destination, while his apostolate came to an abrupt end from a want of missionaries to carry on his work.

Legacy

H. Rider Haggard would base the fictional character, José Silvestre, on Silveira in his 1885 novel, King Solomon's Mines.

Silveira House, a Jesuit development centre in Zimbabwe, is named after him.
Silveira High School and Hospital, a Catholic Mission in Bikita,Zimbabwe is also named after him.

References
Chadwick, Life of the Ven. Goncalo Da Silveira (Roehampton, 1910);
Theal, Records of S. E. Africa, printed for the Government of Cape Colony, VII (1901);
Wilmot, Monomotapa (London, 1896)

External links
Catholic Encyclopedia article
Biographical article written by Fr W F Rea SJ

1526 births
1561 deaths
People from Almeirim
16th-century Portuguese Jesuits
Portuguese Roman Catholic missionaries
Jesuit missionaries
Portuguese people murdered abroad
People executed by strangulation
People murdered in Zimbabwe
Roman Catholic missionaries in Mozambique
Roman Catholic missionaries in Zimbabwe